Susmita Bauri (born 5 January 1975) is an Indian politician and had been elected on a CPI(M) ticket from the Bishnupur (Lok Sabha constituency) in the Indian state of West Bengal to the 14th and 15th Lok Sabha.

Daughter of Nimai Charan Bauri and Sandhya Bauri, she is a law graduate or LL.B from Hazra Law College of University of Calcutta. As an advocate she provides free legal aid to poor people, especially illiterate women. She belongs to the Bauri community. Her mother, Sandhya Bauri, was a three-time member of Lok Sabha from the same constituency.

In the 14th Lok Sabha she was a member of the Committee on Social Justice and Empowerment and the Standing Committee on Energy. In the 15th Lok Sabha she was a member of the Committee on Chemicals and Fertilizers and the Committee on Absence of Members from Sitting of the House.

References

1975 births
Living people
Communist Party of India (Marxist) politicians from West Bengal
India MPs 2004–2009
India MPs 2009–2014
People from Bankura district
University of Calcutta alumni
Lok Sabha members from West Bengal
Communist Party of India (Marxist) candidates in the 2014 Indian general election
Women in West Bengal politics
21st-century Indian women politicians
21st-century Indian politicians